Vasyl Volodymyr Tuchapets OSBM (born 29 September 1967 in Yavoriv, Lviv Oblast, Ukrainian SSR) is a Ukrainian Greek Catholic hierarch as an Archiepiscopal Exarch of Ukrainian Catholic Archiepiscopal Exarchate of Kharkiv and Titular Bishop of Centuriones since 2 April 2014.

Life
Vasyl Volodymyr Tuchapets was born in the family of Vasyl and Kateryna (née Datsko) Tuchapets in Yavoriv, where he grew up. After graduation of the school education, he graduated the technical college #14 in Ivano-Frankivsk (1982–1986) and made a compulsory service in the Soviet Army (1986–1988). He also studied an architecture in the Lviv Polytechnic (1988–1990). After graduation of the school education he joined a clandestine theological seminary.

During all this time he was a clandestine member of the Order of Saint Basil the Great from 10 November 1986, where he had a profession on 6 October 1991 and a solemn profession on 29 December 1996. Tuchapets was ordained as priest on 12 July 1997 after completing theological studies in Pontifical Theological Faculty in Warsaw (1991–1997). Then he continued his studies with a licentiate degree in patrology.

After returning from studies in Poland, he had a various pastoral assignments and served as professor, superior and rector at the Basilian Institutes in Ukraine. And during 2005-2014 he was a superior of the Basilian monastery in Kyiv.

On 2 April 2014 Tucapets was appointed, and on 21 May 2014 was consecrated to the Episcopate as the first Archiepiscopal Exarch of the new created Ukrainian Catholic Archiepiscopal Exarchate of Kharkiv and the Titular Bishop of Centuriones. The principal consecrator was Sviatoslav Shevchuk, the Head of the Ukrainian Greek Catholic Church.

References

1967 births
Living people
People from Yavoriv
Order of Saint Basil the Great
Ukrainian Eastern Catholics
21st-century Eastern Catholic bishops
Bishops of the Ukrainian Greek Catholic Church